Her Bitter Cup (alternate title A Heart's Crucible) is a 1916 American silent film directed by Cleo Madison. One of only two feature-length films directed by Madison, she also played the leading role, a fervent labor organizer who uses drastic methods to finance her cause of improving the miserable lot of the workers in a factory.

The film is presumed lost.

Synopsis
Factory worker Rethna (Madison) comes from an impoverished background. Her raison d'être is to improve the miserable lot of her fellow workers; her chief foe is the cruel factory-owner. Rethna begins a sexual relationship with Henry Burke (William Mong), the owner's disreputable son, and obtains money from him which she funnels to the workers, doing with Burke's money what she believes the Burkes ought to be doing anyway. After a year, she breaks off her relationship with Henry and marries his brother Walter (Edward Hearn), the better man of the two. She continues to support the factory workers with Burke money, and is eventually found out by her husband. Confronted by Walter, who truly loves her, she tells him that she married him only to gain access to his money and avenge the wrongs done by his family; faced with this admission, Walter leaves Rethna.

While Rethna is at the factory pleading with her father-in-law for better working conditions, a fire breaks out. Rethna is badly burned while saving the elder Burke's life, and is herself saved by Walter. During her convalescence she realizes that she loves her husband and the two are reconciled.  Because of the fire, Walter's father at last resolves to improve conditions at his factory.

Cast

Cleo Madison as Rethna
William Mong as Henry Burke
Edward Hearn as Walter Burke
Ray Hanford as Factory foreman
Adele Farrington as Mary McDougal
Lule Warrenton as Boardinghouse woman
Willis Marks

Production
Once Cleo Madison achieved star status at Universal, she lobbied for and was given the chance to direct. After directing numerous short films in 1915, Madison directed two feature films, the second of which was Her Bitter Cup.

Reception
A contemporary review in the trade paper Motion Picture News gave a mixed opinion of the film, acknowledging Madison's skill and the story overall but expressing confusion about the resolution of the plot. In Moving Picture World, the review also expressed reservations, "The story is quite strong in some respects, but certain features seem to lack proper significance." The review in the New York Clipper was unfavorable and summed up bluntly, "It's so bad it's funny."

References
Notes

Citations

1916 drama films
1916 films
American silent feature films
American black-and-white films
Lost American films
Universal Pictures films
Silent American drama films
1916 lost films
Lost drama films
1910s American films